Tomoxioda is a genus of beetles in the family Mordellidae, containing the following species:

 Tomoxioda aterrima (McLeay, 1872)
 Tomoxioda auropubescens Ermisch, 1950

References

Mordellidae